Qaem Shahr  (also Romanized as Qā’em Shahr; formerly known as Shāhi is a city and capital of Qaem Shahr County, Mazandaran Province, Iran. At the 2016 census, its population was 247,953.
Originally known as Aliyabad, the name Ŝâhi (Shahi) was used until the Iranian Revolution in 1979 when the city acquired its current name.

In 1951, Qa'em Shahr's population was around 18,000, growing to 123,684 in 1991. The city is where the North Iranian railway quits the fertile plains of Mazandaran to cross the highest mountain range of the Middle East, the Alborz.

Notable people
 Behdad Salimi (born 1989) – weightlifter
 Farhad Majidi  – football player
 Nader Dastneshan (1960–2021) – football coach
 Mehrdad Oladi (1985–2016) – football player
 Mehrdad Kafshgari (born 1987) – football player
 Fereydoon Fazli (born 1971) – football player
 Babak Nourzad (born 1978) – wrestler
 Mojtaba Tarshiz (born 1978) – football player
 Farshid Talebi (born 1981) – football player
 Maysam Baou (born 1983) – football player
 Mehdi Jafarpour (born 1984) – football player
 Mohammad Abbaszadeh (born 1990) – football player
 Ali Alipour (born 1995) – football player
 Behnam Tayyebi (born 1975) – wrestler
 Ahmad Mohammadi (born 1989) – wrestler
 Mansour Hedayati – (residence) – poet

Important places 
 Islamic Azad University of Qaemshahr
 Telar jungle park

Sports
Ghaemshahr is one of the sports poles in Iran. World and Olympic champion weightlifter Behdad Salimi hails from Qaem Shahr.

References

Columbia Encyclopedia

 
Populated places in Qaem Shahr County
Cities in Mazandaran Province